Willy Reitgaßl (born 29 February 1936 in Landshut; died 23 August 1988 near Darmstadt) is a retired German football player. He spent five seasons in the Bundesliga with 1. FC Kaiserslautern. He represented Germany in a friendly against Iceland, scoring a goal in that game.

Honours
 DFB-Pokal finalist: 1959–60

References

External links
 

1936 births
1988 deaths
German footballers
Germany international footballers
Karlsruher SC players
1. FC Kaiserslautern players
Bundesliga players
Association football midfielders
Sportspeople from Landshut
Footballers from Bavaria